Pevensey Levels is a  biological Site of Special Scientific Interest between Bexhill-on-Sea and Hailsham in East Sussex. It is a Nature Conservation Review site, Grade I, a Ramsar site and a Special Area of Conservation.

This is a large area of wetland grazing meadows intersected by a network of ditches. It has many nationally rare invertebrates. It may be the best site in Britain for freshwater mollusc fauna, including the endangered shining ram's-horn snail. It also has one nationally rare and several nationally scarce aquatic plants and it is of national importance for lapwing, with more than 1% of the British population.

References

Sussex Wildlife Trust
Sites of Special Scientific Interest in East Sussex
National nature reserves in England
Nature Conservation Review sites
Ramsar sites in England
Special Areas of Conservation in England
Levels